Jon Davison (born July 21, 1949) is an American film producer.

Career
Davison worked at New World Pictures in the 1970s.

His producing credits include Airplane! (1980), RoboCop (1987), RoboCop 2 (1990), Starship Troopers (1997), and The 6th Day (2000).

Davison and animator Sally Cruikshank were married March 17, 1984, and have a daughter, Dinah.

Archive
The moving image collection of Joe Dante and Jon Davison is held at the Academy Film Archive. The joint collection includes feature films, pre-production elements, and theatrical trailer reels.

Select filmography
He was a producer in all films unless otherwise noted.

Film

As an actor

Miscellaneous crew

Second unit director or assistant director

Production manager

Thanks

Television

As an actor

Miscellaneous crew

References

External links 
 

1949 births
American film producers
Living people
Place of birth missing (living people)